Socialism: Utopian and Scientific is a short book first published in 1880 by German-born socialist Friedrich Engels. The work was primarily extracted from a longer polemic work published in 1878, Anti-Dühring. It first appeared in the French language.

The title Socialism: Utopian and Scientific was adopted for the first English edition — the tenth language in which the book appeared. Intended as a popularization of Marxist ideas for a working class readership, the book was one of the fundamental publications of the international socialist movement during the late 19th and early 20th centuries, selling tens of thousands of copies and books.

Background
Throughout the decade of the 1860s, Karl Marx, close personal friend and political associate of Friedrich Engels, dedicated himself to the study of economics, culminating in the publication of the first volume of Das Kapital in 1867. Marx's lengthy and ponderous volume was extremely difficult for the average reader to penetrate, however, leading Engels to suggest to Marx in a letter of September 16, 1868 that a short popularized version of Das Kapital for a working class audience was urgently needed. 

"If it is not written, some Moses or other will come along and do it and botch it up," Engels warned.

Marx concurred with Engels' assessment, suggesting "it would be a very good thing if you yourself wrote a small popular explanatory pamphlet." Engels went on to prepare a short summary of the central points of Das Kapital, but the pamphlet was never published. Nevertheless, the necessity for popularization of Marx's frequently turgid prose remained — a need finally addressed by Engels with the publication of the short work Socialism: Utopian and Scientific more than a decade later.

Publication history
[[File:1900-engels-socialism-cover.jpg|thumb|right|200px|One of a handful of surviving copies of the 1900 second Socialist Labor Party edition of Development of Socialism from Utopia to Science.]]

Rather than a wholly new work, Socialism: Utopian and Scientific was an extract from a larger polemic work written in 1876, Herrn Eugen Dühring's Umwälzung der Wissenschaft (Herr Eugen Dühring's Revolution in Science), commonly known as Anti-Dühring. Three chapters were selected and arranged by Engels and translated into French by Paul Lafargue. 

The resulting pamphlet was ultimately published in Paris in 1880 as Socialisme utopique et Socialisme scientifique (Utopian Socialism and Scientific Socialism). This French translation provided the source of multiple other language versions, including Polish and Spanish editions. 

The pamphlet was finally published in the original German in 1883. The German edition provided the source for additional translations in Italian, Russian, Danish, Dutch, and Romanian. The tardy release of an English edition in 1892 by Swan Sonnenschein & Co. thus marked the 10th language into which the book had been translated.

"I am not aware that any other Socialist work, not even our Communist Manifesto of 1848 or Marx's Capital, has been so often translated," Engels proudly noted at the time of the English edition's 1892 release.

The first American edition of the work was published by the Socialist Labor Party of America (SLP) in 1895 as part of its "People's Library," featuring a new translation by Daniel DeLeon. A new title was employed by DeLeon, Development of Socialism from Utopia to Science. The SLP edition was first reissued in February 1900 and reissued again at various subsequent dates.

The first American edition of the authorized translation by Edward Aveling was published in 1900 by Charles H. Kerr & Co. According to Kerr his firm sold "not less than 30,000" copies of the book between its first release and a new reissue in June 1908.

In his biography of Marx, Isaiah Berlin described it as “the best brief autobiographical appreciation of Marxism by one of its creators” and considered that, “written in Engels's best vein”, it “had a decisive influence on both Russian and German Socialism.”

Summary
The book explains the differences between utopian socialism and scientific socialism, which Marxism considers itself to embody. The book explains that whereas utopian socialism is idealist, reflecting the personal opinions of the authors and claims that society can be adapted based on these opinions, scientific socialism derives itself from reality. It focuses on the materialist conception of history, which is based on an analysis over history, and concludes that the scientific variation of socialism naturally follows capitalism.

Engels begins the book by chronicling the thought of utopian socialists, starting with Saint-Simon. He then proceeds to Fourier and Robert Owen. 

In Chapter Two, he summarizes dialectics, and then chronicles the thought from the ancient Greeks to Hegel. 

Chapter Three summarizes dialectics in relation to economic and social struggles, essentially echoing the words of Marx.

Proposed sequelSocialism: Utopian and Scientific was one of the best selling and most widely-read socialist publications of the period 1880 to 1910. Plans were subsequently made to adapt another section of Anti-Dühring for a popular audience, and three chapters from Part 2, each entitled "The Theory of Force," were selected for this new publication. In addition, Engels wished to write a new fourth chapter, demonstrating for the German reader "the very considerable role played by force in the history of his own country."

Engels began this chapter dealing with the history of Germany between the revolution of 1848 and the ascension to the office of Chancellor by Otto von Bismarck in 1871, with particular reference to Bismarck's policy of "blood and iron." However, time constraints related to Engels' editing of the later volumes of Das Kapital caused him to lay the manuscript — and the project — aside. 

This material from the proposed short book, Die Rolle der Gewalt in der Geschichte (The Role of Force in History), finally saw print in English translation in 1968.

Footnotes

SourcesMarx and Engels: Basic writings on Politics and Philosophy''

External links
 First edition at Internet Archive
 Full text online at Marxists Internet Archive
 

1878 books
Political books
Books by Friedrich Engels
Utopian theory